Avon is a town in Norfolk County, Massachusetts, United States.

History

The first settler in the land that would become Avon was Moses Curtis, a blacksmith from Braintree, Massachusetts. With most of his surviving children living near him, by 1749 the locale was called Curtis Corners.

The Third Baptist Meeting House was erected in East Stoughton on 30 March 1848.

Geography
Avon is bordered by the City of Brockton on the south, Stoughton on the west, Randolph on the northeast, and Holbrook on the east.

Demographics

At the 2000 census, there were 4,443 people, 1,705 households and 1,220 families residing in the town. The racial makeup of the town was 93.45% White, 3.74% African American, 0.27% Native American, 0.92% Asian, 0.77% from other races, and 0.86% from two or more races. Hispanic or Latino of any race were 1.44% of the population. 

There were 1,705 households, of which 26.7% had children under the age of 18 living with them, 55.5% were married couples living together, 12.0% had a female householder with no husband present, and 28.4% were non-families. Of all households 23.5% were made up of individuals, and 12.3% had someone living alone who was 65 years of age or older. The average household size was 2.61 and the average family size was 3.13.

Age distribution was 22.5% under the age of 18, 7.0% from 18 to 24, 28.8% from 25 to 44, 24.2% from 45 to 64, and 17.6% who were 65 years of age or older. The median age was 40 years. For every 100 females, there were 91.8 males. For every 100 females age 18 and over, there were 88.0 males.

The median household income was $50,305, and the median family income was $60,625. Males had a median income of $41,582 versus $32,837 for females. The per capita income for the town was $24,410. About 4.3% of families and 6.6% of the population were below the poverty line, including 12.5% of those under age 18 and 4.2% of those age 65 or over.

Government
Avon is governed by a three-person Board of Selectmen who appoint a Town Administrator to carry out the day to day executive functions of the Board. Legislation is enacted in an Open Town Meeting.

Education
The Avon School District serves Avon.

Transportation
The town is served by the Brockton Area Transit Authority and the Massachusetts Bay Transportation Authority (MBTA), which provide public transit service to Brockton and Boston.

References

External links

 Avon Municipal Web Site

Towns in Massachusetts
Towns in Norfolk County, Massachusetts